Henry Peirson Harland (1 September 1876 – 11 August 1945) was a unionist politician in Northern Ireland.

Born in Uxbridge, Harland studied at Rugby School before being appointed as a director or Harland and Wolff, and of Short and Harland.  He worked as an engineer worldwide before winning the Belfast East by-election in 1940 for the Ulster Unionist Party.  Despite holding a seat in Northern Ireland, he lived in Aldenham, Hertfordshire.  He died shortly before the 1945 general election.

References

External links 
 

1876 births
1945 deaths
Members of the Parliament of the United Kingdom for Belfast constituencies (since 1922)
People educated at Rugby School
People from Uxbridge
UK MPs 1935–1945
Ulster Unionist Party members of the House of Commons of the United Kingdom
People from Aldenham
20th-century British engineers